Zsanett Kötél (born ) is a Hungarian female volleyball player, playing as a setter. She is part of the Hungary women's national volleyball team.

She competed at the 2015 Women's European Volleyball Championship. On club level she plays for Amiens Longueau.

References

External links
http://rcsvolley.eu/category/kotel-zsanett/
http://volleyworld.hu/kotel-zsanett-marad-franciaorszagban-de-klubot-valt/

1986 births
Living people
Hungarian women's volleyball players
Place of birth missing (living people)